One Love is a 2003 Jamaican film starring Ky-Mani Marley and Cherine Anderson. It was written by Trevor D. Rhone and directed by Rick Elgood and Don Letts.

Plot
A young Rasta musician falls in love with the gospel-singing daughter of a Pentecostal preacher, meeting her as they both sign up for a music contest in which the winner will get twenty thousand US dollars and a record deal. When they start falling in love her father forbids her from seeing him because he wants her to marry a church member. They face overcoming the preacher's disapproval as well as battling a corrupt record producer.

Cast
 Ky-Mani Marley as Kassa
 Vas Blackwood as Scarface
 Cherine Anderson as Serena
 Idris Elba as Aaron
 Winston Bell as Selector G
 Winston Stona as Pastor Johnson

In addition to the singing of the two principals, the soundtrack includes Bob Marley and Shaggy.

External links
 

2003 films
Jamaican drama films
2000s romance films
2000s English-language films
Films directed by Don Letts